James McLaughlin, also James W. MacLaughlin an J.W. McLaughlin was an American film actor and director.

Filmography

Actor 
 The Girl from the East  as Jim Brandon (1915)
 The Scrub as Dick Blackwood (1915)
 The Vagabond Prince as "Red" Kelly (1916)
 The Tar Heel Warrior as James Adams (1917)
 God's Gold as Corwin Carson (1921)
 Black Sheep as José (1921)
 Reputation as a Heavy man (stage sequence)  (1921)
 South of Northern Lights as Caporal McAllister (1922)
 The Fighting Strain as Herbert Canfield (1923)
 Three Pals Wingate's Secretary  (1926)

Director 
 Beyond the Shadows (1918)
 Hell's End (1918)
 Closin' In (1918)
 The Man Who Woke Up (1918)

Bibliography

American Film Institute. The American Film Institute Catalog of Motion Pictures Produced in the United States Part 1, Volume 1. University of California Press, 1971.

External links 

American male film actors
American film directors